Xanthopyreniaceae is a family of lichen-forming fungi in the order Collemopsidiales.
The family was circumscribed by lichenologist Alexander Zahlbruckner in 1926.

Genera
This is a list of the genera in the Xanthopyreniaceae, based on a 2022 review and summary of fungal classification by Wijayawardene and colleagues. Following the genus name is the taxonomic authority (those who first circumscribed the genus; standardized author abbreviations are used), year of publication, and the number of species:
Collemopsidium  – 27 spp.
Didymellopsis  – 6 spp.
Frigidopyrenia  – 1 sp.
Rhagadodidymellopsis  – 1 sp.
Xanthopyrenia  – 4 spp.
Zwackhiomacromyces  – 2 spp.
Zwackhiomyces  – 35 spp.

References

 
 

 
Dothideomycetes families
Lichen families
Taxa described in 1926
Taxa named by Alexander Zahlbruckner